The 2017 AFL Women's draft consisted of the various periods when the eight clubs in the AFL Women's competition could recruit players prior to the competition's 2018 season.

As the previous season's player contracts were all capped at one-year deals, all existing AFLW players must be re-signed prior to the 2018 season. Entering the second season of the competition, clubs will have larger list sizes, with 27 senior listed players (up from 25), and three rookie listed players (up from two).

Signing and trading period
Beginning 1 May, clubs were given an 18-day window to re-sign players on their lists from the previous season, with teams being required to retain between 15 and 22 players during that period. There was also a window for teams to trade players and draft picks in a trade period that started on 15 May 2017, and continued for 12 days.

Players were eligible to seek a trade should they receive a contract offer from a rival club at a pay scale level above their previous years' salary. Players could also reject any offer from their existing club lower rate than in 2017, and become restricted free agents permitted to sign with another club at or above their previous salary.

Players who do not receive offers from their 2017 club were free to sign with any club during the four-day free agency period starting 29 May 2017 or to nominate for the 2017 draft.

Trades

Retirements and delistings

Free agency
A four-day free agency period was held from 29 May for clubs to secure non-signed players from other clubs.

A second free agency period opened at the conclusion of the draft, allowing undrafted players to be signed. This period closed on 19 October, the day after the draft.

Salary
AFLW players salaries are managed and paid in full by the AFL on behalf of the clubs. A pay deal struck between the league and the AFLPA in November 2016 set the 2018 season payment structure as follows:

It is expected that these salaries will be renegotiated and increased, as the time commitment of players was found to be greater than expected during the 2017 season.

In addition, players are provided with playing boots and runners, an interstate travel allowance, income insurance, out-of-pocket medical expense coverage, and an allowance to pay for a carer for a child under 12 months of age when travelling interstate.

Draft
A draft was held 18 October 2017. It operated with players nominating for a single state's draft pool and players only being eligible to be drafted by clubs operating in that state. Clubs concluded the draft period with a total of 30 players, 27 of these being senior listed and three of these being rookie players.

Final draft order

Rookie draft
The rookie draft took place on 20 October 2017. Players qualify for the rookie draft if they are under the age of 21 or are crossing from another sport.

Rookie signings

See also
 2017 AFL draft

References

AFL Women's draft
Draft
AFL women's draft
2010s in Melbourne
Australian rules football in Victoria (Australia)
Sport in Melbourne
Events in Melbourne